Private Albert Edward Potter (23 September 1897 – 4 May 1942) was an English professional footballer who played in the Football League for Exeter City and Wigan Borough as a left half.

Personal life 
Potter served as a private in the Devonshire Regiment during the First World War and saw action on the Western Front (where he was wounded) and in the Siege of Kut in Mesopotamia. He served as an Air Raid Warden during the Second World War and was killed during the Exeter Blitz in May 1942. Potter was buried in All Saints Cemetery, Whipton, Exeter.

References

English footballers
English Football League players
British Army personnel of World War I
Association football wing halves
1897 births
1942 deaths
Association football fullbacks
Sportspeople from Exeter
Exeter City F.C. players
Wigan Borough F.C. players
Colwyn Bay F.C. players
Devonshire Regiment soldiers
Military personnel from Exeter
British civilians killed in World War II
Deaths by airstrike during World War II
Civil Defence Service personnel
Burials in Devon